This is a list of all the notable places in the city of Faisalabad, the third largest city in Pakistan.  Faisalabad is also called Manchester of Pakistan due its textile importance in Pakistan. The city is known for its colonial heritage and its roots tracing back to the rule of the British Empire.

City District

Towns 
Since 2005, the administration of Faisalabad has been divided into eight tehsil municipal administration areas (TMAs):
 Lyallpur Town
 Madina Town
 Jinnah Town 
 Iqbal town
 Chak Jhumra Town 
 Jaranwala Town 
 Samundri Town 
 Tandlianwala Town
 Ghulam Muhammad Abad

Neighbourhoods 
 Amin Town, residential neighborhood on the Faisalabad Canal Expressway
 Batala Colony, residential neighborhood
 Civil Lines, Civil Lines neighborhood built during the British Raj for British civilian officers
 D Ground, commercial area
Gatwala, commercial area
Ghulam Muhammad Abad, residential neighborhood
 Gobind Pura, residential neighborhood
 Gokhowal, residential neighborhood
 Gulbahar Colony, residential neighborhood in southern Faisalabad
 Gulberg, residential and commercial area
 Gulistan Colony, residential neighborhood
 Madan Pura, residential neighborhood on the Aziz Bhatti Expressway
 Manawala, residential neighborhood
 Mansoorabad, residential neighborhood
 Millat Town, residential neighborhood
 Motorway City, residential neighborhood
Nishatabad, residential neighborhood

Points of interest

Colonial architecture

Modern architecture

Colonial buildings 
Structures built by the British Empire. 
 Faisalabad Clock Tower
 Faisalabad Railway Station
 Gumti Water Fountain
 Qaisery Gate
 Central Jail Faisalabad

Libraries 
 University of Agriculture Libraries
 Faisalabad Medical University Main Library
 Government College University Library 
 National Textile University Library

Museums 
 Lyallpur Museum
 Agricultural Museum
Science Center Museum

Shopping

Markets 
The Faisalabad clock tower and its eight bazaars (markets) are still a major trading zone in the city today. Each of the eight bazaars has a special name and is known for selling certain goods;
 Katchery Bazaar, named for the court (Katchery) is known for its mobile phone and accessory market.
 Rail Bazar is a gold and cloth market.
 Bhawana Bazaar supplies electrical and electronic goods.
 Jhang Bazaar supplies fish, meat, vegetables and fruits.
 Aminpur Bazaar supplies stationery and interior décor.
 Kharkhana Bazaar is known for herbal medicines.
 Gol Bazaar contains dry fruit, as well as wholesale soap, oil, and ghee shops.
 Chiniot Bazaar is famous for allopathic and homeopathic medicinal stores, cloth, blankets, sofa cloth, and curtains. It also has poultry feed wholesale shops.
 Montgomery Bazaar (also known as Sutar Mandi) is known for yarn and raw cloth trading.

Parks 
 Gatwala Wildlife Park

Sports 

 Iqbal Stadium, Cricket Stadium
 Faisalabad Hockey Stadium

Entertainment 
 Sindbad Amusement Park
 Funland 
Gatwala Wildlife Park

Religious

Shrines 
There are a number of Sufi Muslim sites in the city.
 Baba Noor Shah Wali - Graveyard Near Lorry Ada.
 Baba Lasoori Shah - Reegal Road, Jhang Bazaar.
 Mohadas-e-Azam' Molna Saradr Ahmad'' - Jhang Bazaar.
 Baba Qaim Sain - Mohallah Faizabad. 
 Sufi Barkat Ali Ludhianwi - Dalowal Samundri Road.
 Baba Gujjar Peer - Ghulam Muhammad Abad.
 Sabri Darbar.
 Rehmani Darbar Sharif
 Darbar Imam Jalvi
 Darbar Mahi Shah Sarkar
 Darbar e Ghousia
 Baba Shah Saleem Peer Bahwal Haq - Peoples Colony no: 1.
 Baba Rati Rata Wali Sarkar 70GB 
 Darbar Sakhi Baba Malan Shah Qadir Qalandar Mast - Narwala Road.
Baba mastan shah chak 38jb dobora

Churches 
 Cathedral of Sts. Peter and Paul

Gurdwaras 
 Gurudwara Panjvin Patshahi Lyallpur

Roads 

Abdullahpur Flyover (Crossing Faisalabad Railway Station)
Nishatabad Flyover (Crossing Sangla Hill Road & railway lines at Nishatabad)

Hospitals 
Al Noor Hospital
 Allied Hospital (Teaching hospital of Faisalabad Medical University)
 DHQ Hospital, Faisalabad (Teaching hospital of Faisalabad Medical University)
 Children Hospital, Faisalabad (Institute of Child health  Faisalabad)
St. Raphael's Hospital

See also 
 List of places in Lahore
 List of places in Multan

References 

Faisalabad
 
Faisalabad-related lists
Faisalabad